Digambar Kamat (born 8 March 1954) is an Indian politician. He was the Chief Minister of Goa from 2007 to 2012. Manohar Parikar succeeded him after his term as the Chief Minister of Goa. From 2006 to 2019, he was the president of Swimming Federation of India. Currently, he serves as an MLA from the Margao constituency.

Early life
Digambar was born in Margao. He holds a bachelor's degree in science (BSc).

Political career
Digambar Vasantrao Kamat started his career as a member of the Indian National Congress. In 1994, he joined the Bharatiya Janata Party Coalition government. In 2005, he again joined the Indian National Congress to support the Margao constituency voters' referendum choice. Kamat passed the baton of leadership on 6 March 2012, to a  BJP majority government in the Goa Assembly Elections held in March 2012. He retained his Margao Constituency seat and continued until 2019 as elected legislative member of Margao Constituency.

Chief Minister of Goa 
He became Chief Minister of Goa in 2007.

Leader of Opposition, Goa 
On 17th July 2019, Digambar Kamat was unanimously chosen a leader of opposition of Goa Legislative Assembly representing the Indian National Congress. In March 2022, he was once again elected as a legislative member of Margao Constituency.

On 31st March 2022, he was appointed a permanent invitee to the Congress Working Committee (CWC). In July 2022, he was removed as the 'Permanent Invitee' to CWC.

Defection to BJP 
On 14 September 2022, Kamat along with senior Congress leader Michael Lobo, and 6 other Congress MLAs joined Bharatiya Janata Party, after meeting Dr. Pramod Sawant, BJP Chief Minister of Goa. The defection was a result of a successful Operation Kamala.

Personal life
Digambar is married to Asha and has two children.

References

External links
Official Website
MGP withdraws support; Victoria quits
Digambar Kamat

Chief Ministers of Goa
Living people
1954 births
Corruption in Goa
People from Margao
Former members of Indian National Congress from Goa
Goa MLAs 2022–2027
Bharatiya Janata Party politicians from Goa
Goa MLAs 2017–2022